Bandarban Cantonment is a cantonment located in Bandarban. The headquarter of 69th Infantry Brigade of Bangladesh Army locate here. It is one of five cantonment in Chittagong Hill Tracts area.

Organization 
 69 Infantry Brigade
 6 East Bengal
 18 East Bengal
 29 Bangladesh Infantry Regiment
 7 Field Ambulance
 110 Brigade Signal Company
 143 Field Workshop Company 
 SSD, Bandarban
 OSP -3

Education
 Bandarban Cantonment Public School and College

See also 
 Comilla Cantonment
 Alikadam Cantonment
 Savar Cantonment

References

Cantonments of Bangladesh